Nebojša Ivančević (born 1 September 1994) is a Serbian/Croatian footballer who plays as a forward.

Career
Born in Vojnić, Republic of Serbian Krajina, nowadays Croatia, he played with Serbian lower-league side Radnički Nova Pazova.

In January 2017, Ivančević signed a 3-year contract with Bulgarian First League side Montana. On 12 February 2017, he made his professional debut in a 0–4 home loss against Ludogorets Razgrad, coming on as a substitute for Steven Petkov. On 7 September 2017, his contract was terminated by mutual consent.

During the winter-break of 2017–18 he joined Serbian First League side Inđija.

References

External links

1994 births
People from Karlovac County
Living people
Serbs of Croatia
Serbian footballers
Association football forwards
FK Radnički Nova Pazova players
FC Montana players
FK Inđija players
FK Radnički 1923 players
FK Budućnost Dobanovci players
OFK Bačka players
NK Drava Ptuj (2004) players
FC Ripensia Timișoara players
First Professional Football League (Bulgaria) players
Second Professional Football League (Bulgaria) players
Serbian First League players
Serbian SuperLiga players
Slovenian Second League players
Liga II players
Serbian expatriate footballers
Expatriate footballers in Bulgaria
Serbian expatriate sportspeople in Bulgaria
Expatriate footballers in Slovenia
Serbian expatriate sportspeople in Slovenia
Expatriate footballers in Romania
Serbian expatriate sportspeople in Romania